The Hooshang Golshiri Literary Award is an Iranian literary award notable for being one of the few literary awards in Iran that is run by a non-governmental organization.  Established in 2000, the award is sponsored by the non-profit Golshiri Foundation. The award focuses on modern contemporary Iranian literature. It is named in honor of Hooshang Golshiri, one of the most distinguished pioneers of Iranian modern fiction, who died in 2000.  The first award was given in 2001 (1380 Solar Hijri calendar).

Categories 
The award is presented in four categories: Best Novel, Best Short Story Collection, Best First Novel, Best First Short Story Collection. Recipients receive 10 million Rials for Best Novel and Best Short Story Collection, 2 million Rials for the Best First Novel, and 5 million Rials for Best First Short Story Collection.

Eligible works are novels and collections of short stories published in Persian in Iran for the first time in that particular year.  Iranian authors living outside the country but who publish in Iran are eligible.

Winners
2001 (1380)
Best Novel: Ahmad Mahmoud, The Fig Tree of the Temples
Best First Novel: Sepideh Shamlou, As if You Had Said Leyli
Best Short Story Collection: Ali Khodaei, Keep Me Warm All the Winter Long
Best First Short Story Collection: Mohammad Asef Soltanzadeh, We Fade in Flight
2002 (1381)
Best Novel: Zoya Pirzad, I will Turn off the Lights
Best First Novel: Reza Ghassemi, The Nocturnal Harmony
Best Short Story Collection: Mohammad Rahim Okhovat, Our Wandering Half
Best First Short Story Collection: Marjan Shir-Mohammadi, After That Night
2003 (1382)
Best Novel: Fariba Vafi, My Bird
Best First Novel: none
Best Short Story Collection: Shiva Arastouei, Sunlight, Moonlight
Best First Story Collection: Soheila Baski, Little Shred and Bahram Moradi, Laughter in the House of Loneliness
2004 (1383)
Best Novel: Aboutorab Khosravi, Rood-e-Raavi
Best First Novel: Rouhangiz Sharifian, Who Believes, Rustam
Best Short Story Collection: Kourosh Asadi, National Park
Best First Short Story Collection:  Moniraldin Beirouti, Single Clay and Ibrahim Damshenas, Nahast
2005 (1384)
Best Novel: Mohammad Hosseini, Bluer than Sin and Yaghoub Yadail, Rituals of Restlessness
Best First Novel: Soudabeh Ashrafi, Fish Sleep at Night and Farhad Bordbar, The Hue of Crow
Best Short Story Collection: Mohammad-Hossein Mohammadi, Red Figs of Mazar 
Best First Short Story Collection: Mahsa Moheb’ali, Love-making in Footnotes
2006 (1385)
Best Novel: Moniraldin Beiruti, Four Pangs and Fariba Vafi, The Dream of Tibet
Best First Novel: Mehdi Raeisol Mohadesin, The Palmist
Best Short Story Collection: Hossein Sanapour, The Dark Side of Words
Best First Short Story Collection: Hamidreza Najafi, Gravel Gardens
2007 (1386)
Best Novel: Asghar Elahi, Salmargi
Best First Novel: Hossein Mortezaeian Abkenar, Scorpion on Andimeshk Railway Stairs
Best Short Story Collection: Mohammad Asef Soltanzadeh, Asgar Goriz
Best First Short Story Collection: Amirhossein Khorshidfar, Life Goes on According to Your Will
2008 (1387)
The nominees were announced but no winners.
2009 (1388)
Best Short Story Collection:  Hamed Habibi, Where Flat Tire Repairing is Done and Peyman Esmaeili, Snow and the Cloudy Symphony
Best First Short Story Collection:  Hamed Esmaeilion, Thyme is not Fair and Pedram Rezaeizadeh, The Game of Death
2010 (1389)
Best Novel: Mahsa Moheb’ali, Don't Worry
Best First Novel: Sara Salar, Probably I'm Lost
2011 (1390)
Best Novel: none
Best First Novel: Jairan Gahan, Under the Lazy Afternoon Sun
Best Short Story Collection: Ahmad Gholami, Humans and AbouTorab Khosravi, Desolate Book
Best First Short Story Collection: Amirhossein Yazdanbod, The Portrait of an Incomplete Man and Neda Kavousifar, Sleeping with Eyes Wide
2012 (1391)
 Best First Short Story Collection: Mohammad Tolouei, I'm Not Janette (2011) and Spideh Siavashi, Laugh in Persian
 Best First Novel: Salman Amin, Qal'eh-Morqi: Pyramid Period and Reza Zangi Abadi, Partridge Hunting
 Lifetime Literary Award: Mahmoud Dowlatabadi
2013 (1392)
Best First Novel: Salman Amin, Ghale Morghi: Rouzegare Herami
Best First Story Collection: Sepideh Siavashi, Laugh in Farsi and Mohammad Tolouei, I’m Not Janette
2014 (1393)
Best Novel: Hamed Esmaeilion, Dr. Datis
Best Short Story Collection:  Mohsen Abbasi, In Twilight and Ali Changizi, Oblique Pines
2015 (1394)

References

External links
Golshiri Foundation, official website (English)

Iranian literary awards
Awards established in 2000
2000 establishments in Iran
Fiction awards